Robin Hood was a tea clipper built by Alexander Hall and Sons, in Aberdeen, Scotland, in 1856. The ship's best known commander was Capt. Cobb. The ship is remembered for a 107-day passage to San Francisco.

References

Tea clippers
Individual sailing vessels
Ships built in Aberdeen
1856 ships
Tea in the United Kingdom